Helen St. John is a singer-songwriter, pianist, lyricist and recording artist.

St. John's claim to fame came as a result of her piano performances on the soundtrack of the motion picture Flashdance, "Love Theme from Flashdance," which resulted in two Grammy nominations: Best Pop Instrumental Performance and Album of the Year.

The 2008 CD Moment By Moment is her first release as a singer-songwriter. She has produced a CD of modern spiritually-inspired songs driven by world beats and pop drums.

St. John was involved in the making of the soundtracks for Scarface, Superman III and Electric Dreams and two of her solo albums, Power to the Piano and Take Your Passion, were produced by Giorgio Moroder.

Discography
Soundtrack albums:
Flashdance
Scarface
 Superman III
Electric Dreams

Solo albums:
Moment by Moment (2008)
Power to the Piano
Take Your Passion

External links
 Helen St. John Official Website
 Helen St. John on iTunes
 

American Christian Scientists
American women singer-songwriters
American keyboardists
American lyricists
American pop pianists
American singer-songwriters
Composers of Christian music
Christian music songwriters
Performers of contemporary Christian music
Living people
American performers of Christian music
Year of birth missing (living people)
21st-century American pianists
21st-century American women pianists